Terebelliformia is a group of polychaete worms in the phylum Annelida.

Phylogeny
The internal relationships within the clade Terebelliformia are the following:

References

Polychaetes